Canal+ Cinéma is a French TV channel devoted to movie programming. It belongs to Les Chaînes Canal+ and the Ciné-Séries package of Canal+. It does not broadcast advertising.

Canal+ Cinéma has an African version, on channel 4 of Canal+ Afrique.

History
Originally, the channel launched on 27 April 1996 as "Canal+ Jaune" on satellite and cable. Its programmes consisted of a multicast of Canal+ films.

On 28 June 2002, Canal+ Jaune applied to the CSA to obtain a frequency on TNT.

As part of the creation of the Canal+ "Bouquet", the channel changed its name on 1 November 2003 to Canal+ Cinéma. The application was approved and the CSA assigned a frequency on the multiplex R3 DTT from where it begins to be issued as early as 21 November 2005.

Since 12 October 2010, the channel had begun broadcasting a high definition (HD) version of the channel.

See also
 Canal+
 Canal+ Séries
 Canal+ Family
 Canal+ Sport
 Canal+ Décalé

External links
 Official Website

Television stations in France
Canal+
Television channels and stations established in 2003